Norman Jaquy Bassette (born 09 November 2004) is a Belgian professional footballer who plays as a forward for SM Caen.

Club career 
Norman Bassette rose through the ranks of Royal Excelsior Virton of the Belgian second division. When financial troubles (not even being awarded a professional license for the 2020–21 season) struck Virton, Bassette joined the French Ligue 2 side of Stade Malherbe Caen in the summer of 2020. He started playing with the under-17, during a season where very few youth games were played because of the covid pandemic.  He signed a full-time 3-years contract with the Norman club at the end of the season.

Having started the 2021–22 season playing with the National 2 reserve team, Bassette was soon called to the first team, in late August 2021. He made his professional debut for Caen on the 11 September 2021, replacing Johann Lepenant in a 2-1 home Ligue 2 loss against Pau FC.

International career 
Bassette received his first call to the Belgium under-18 team on the 23 August 2021, playing the two games against Norway and Sweden as a starter in early September.

Style of play 
Norman Bassette mainly plays as a centre-forward, soon proving to be a very prolific goalscorer in Caen's youth teams, where he was compared to his young teammate Andréas Hountondji.

References

External links

2004 births
Living people
Belgian footballers
Belgium youth international footballers
Association football forwards
Stade Malherbe Caen players
Ligue 2 players
Belgian expatriate footballers
Expatriate footballers in France
Belgian expatriate sportspeople in France
People from Arlon
Footballers from Luxembourg (Belgium)